is an underground railway station on the Senseki Line in Miyagino-ku in Sendai, Miyagi, Japan, operated by East Japan Railway Company (JR East).

Lines
Miyaginohara Station is served by the Senseki Line.

Station layout
The station is an underground station with one island platform serving two tracks. The station has a Midori no Madoguchi staffed ticket office. As the station is the closest railway station to Rakuten Seimei Park Miyagi, home of the Tohoku Rakuten Golden Eagles, logos of the team, images of their players, as well as art of their mascots, Clutch and Clutchyna, are shown prominently in the station, as well as having the model of the team's cap on top of the entrance. Clutch is drawn in the platform for the 2nd platform, while Clutchyna is drawn on the 1st platform.

Platforms

History
Miyaginohara Station opened on January 1, 1926, as a station on the Miyagi Electric Railway. The line was nationalized on May 1, 1944. The station was absorbed into the JR East network upon the privatization of JNR on April 1, 1987. The station was relocated underground in 2000, some 150 meters to the southeast of its former location. On March 26, 2010, the station added its own departure melody, which is a part of the theme song of the Tohoku Rakuten Golden Eagles.

Passenger statistics
In fiscal 2018, the station was used by an average of 6,070 passengers daily (boarding passengers only).

Surrounding area
 Miyagi Baseball Stadium
 Sendai City Athletic Stadium
 Sendai Ikuei Gakuen High School Miyaginohara Campus

See also
 List of railway stations in Japan

References

External links

  

Railway stations in Sendai
Senseki Line
Railway stations in Japan opened in 1926
Stations of East Japan Railway Company